Lijevča may refer to:

 Lijevče field in northwestern Bosnia and Herzegovina
 Lijevča, Zavidovići, a village near Zavidovići, Bosnia and Herzegovina